The 1956–57 Spartan League season was the 39th in the history of Spartan League, an association football league in London and the adjoining counties. The league consisted of 14 teams.

League table

The division featured 14 teams, all from last season.

References

1956–57
9